Roman Savievich Izyaev (January 29, 1940 - April 29, 2018) was a Soviet, Russian and Israeli stage actor, artistic director, screenwriter and scenic designer of the Judeo-Tat theatre. For his contributions to the development of domestic theatrical art and many years of creative activity awarded with the Order of the Badge of Honour (1985). Founder and artistic director of the first Judeo-Tat language theater "Rambam" in Israel (2001-2017). He has performed with his theater in many cities in Russia, Israel, Azerbaijan, Canada and the United States.

Biography

Roman Izyaev was 17 years old when the famous artist Akhso Shalumova invited him to play in the Judeo-Tat theatre in the city of Derbent, which was the beginning of his theatrical life.

From 1986 to 2001, Roman Izyaev served as the artistic director of the Judeo-Tat theatre in Derbent, where he played the main roles in many performances.

In 2001 he immigrated to Israel. In the Israeli city of Hadera, Roman Izyaev founded theatre "Rambam" in the Judeo-Tat language, where he was the artistic director, actor, screenwriter and set designer. In Israel, he wrote two plays: (Juhuri: Шуьвер се зени) – "The Husband of Three Wives" and (Juhuri: Э хори Бебеho) - "The Promised Land". 

During the period of his work at the theater "Rambam", Roman Izyaev performed with his theater in many cities of Israel,  as well as abroad: Russia, Azerbaijan, Canada and the USA. At the Master Theater in Brooklyn, New York. The theater presented a musical comedy (Juhuri:Хуьсуьр) - "Mother-in-law" based on the play by the Azerbaijani playwright Mejid Shamkhalov.

Roman Izyaev staged performances based on the stories of the writer Hizgil Avshalumov (Juhuri: "Кишди хьомоли") - "Sash of childlessness"  and (Juhuri: Шими Дербенди) - "Shimi Derbendi", where he played the role of Shimi. He also staged one-act plays by Mikhail Dadashev and "Divorce in the Caucasus", by Vyacheslav Davydov.

In 2017, due to his illness, Roman Izyaev left the stage.

Roman Izyaev died on April 29, 2018 in the city of Or Akiva, Israel.

References

External links
Condolences on the death of the artistic director of the "Rambam" theater Roman Izyaev
The artistic director of the world's only Judeo-tat theatre "Rambam" Roman Izyaev passed away
The premiere of the "Rambam" theater is dedicated to the memory of its founder Roman Izyaev
The curtain fell. In memory of the chief director of the "Rambam" theater Roman Izyaev
Roman Izyaev: "Theater of Mountain Jews - in Israel this is our last fortress"
The world's only Judeo-Tat theatre will perform in Moscow for the first time
The curtain fell. In memory of the chief director of the "Rambam" theater Roman Izyaev
Theater "Rambam" staged the comedy "Sash of childlessness" in Hadera

1940 births
2018 deaths
People from Derbent
Soviet male stage actors
Russian male stage actors
21st-century Russian male actors
20th-century Russian male actors
20th-century Israeli male actors
21st-century Israeli male actors
Israeli male stage actors
Israeli theatre directors
Israeli male screenwriters
20th-century Russian screenwriters
Male screenwriters
20th-century Russian male writers
20th-century Israeli screenwriters
21st-century Russian screenwriters
21st-century Israeli screenwriters
Actors and directors of the Judeo-Tat language theater